Light for the Ages -35th Anniversary Best～Fan's Selection- is a compilation album by Japanese singer/songwriter Mari Hamada, released on January 23, 2019 by Victor Entertainment. To celebrate her 35th anniversary, Hamada set up a poll online, with the 40 most popular songs selected for the three-disc album. A limited edition release of the album came with a 40-page photobook.

Light for the Ages peaked at No. 7 on Oricon's albums chart and No. 11 on Billboard Japan's Hot Albums Chart.

Track listing

Charts

References

External links 
  (Mari Hamada)
  (Victor Entertainment)
 
 

2019 compilation albums
Japanese-language compilation albums
Mari Hamada compilation albums
Victor Entertainment compilation albums